The Four Aces are an American male traditional pop quartet popular since the 1950s. Over the last half-century, the group amassed many gold records. Its million-selling songs include "Love is a Many-Splendored Thing", "Three Coins in the Fountain", "Stranger in Paradise", "Tell Me Why", and "(It's No) Sin". Other big sellers included "Shangri-La", "Perfidia", and "Sincerely".  The original members, responsible for every song made popular by the group, included Al Alberts, Dave Mahoney, Lou Silvestri, and Rosario "Sod" Vaccaro.

Career
Alberts went to South Philadelphia High School and Temple University and served in the United States Navy, where he met Mahoney. Originally, Alberts sang with Mahoney playing behind him, and later they added Vaccaro on trumpet and Silvestri on drums. They played locally in the Philadelphia area, and Alberts started his own record label, Victoria Records, when they could not find a distributor to release their first record, "(It's No) Sin". It sold a million copies, and Decca Records soon signed the group, billing them as The Four Aces featuring Al Alberts.

Alberts left the group in 1958 to try to make it as a soloist but never made the charts. He was replaced as lead singer by Fred Diodati, who had attended South Philadelphia High School a few years after Alberts. After Alberts had left the group, Mahoney and Vaccaro also left. Silvestri never left the group but led three new members: Diodati, Tony Alesi, and Joe Giglio. The Original Aces later asked Silvestri to rejoin the original group, and he did.

It was then that Diodati led a new line-up, which consisted of Diodati, Alesi, Giglio, and Harry Heisler. After almost 19 years with the group, Alesi developed a medical condition that forced him to leave the group.  the Four Aces members were Diodati, Giglio, Heisler, and Danny Colingo. By 2019 Heisler had been replaced by Bob Barboni. 

In 1975, Diodati, Alesi, Giglio, and Heisler were awarded the right to the name in a court suit in which the original members tried to re-establish their right. The court allowed the founding members to tour as "The Original Four Aces, Featuring Al Alberts", which they did, finally retiring the act in 1987. Diodati, Giglio, Barboni, and Colingo continue to legally use the name of the Four Aces and perform the songs made popular by the Original Four Aces.

The founding lead singer, Alberts, died of natural causes on November 27, 2009, at age 87.  Mahoney died on July 12, 2012, of complications from Alzheimer's disease at age 86. Silvestri died on January 27, 2013, at age 86.  Vaccaro (born in 1922) died on April 5, 2013, at age 90.

Singles

* "Stranger in Paradise" charted in 1955 in the UK

Awards and recognition
The Four Aces were inducted into the Vocal Group Hall of Fame in 2001.
The Four Aces were inducted into the Philadelphia Music Alliance Walk of Fame in 1988.

Other uses
In the 1930s a vocal group recorded under the name The Four Aces (A Human Orchestra). They vocalized not only the lyrics but all instrumental parts of their music, recording on the Decca label in the UK.

In 1948–49, Bill Haley fronted a group called the Four Aces of Western Swing – often referred to as simply The Four Aces. The style of music this group played was country and western, and it was with the group that Haley recorded his first singles for the Cowboy Records label in 1948. The group disbanded in 1949, and Haley went on to form The Saddlemen, which later became Bill Haley & His Comets.

References

External links
'The Four Aces' Vocal Group Hall of Fame Page
Philadelphia Music Alliance Walk of Fame

Chicago blues ensembles

American pop music groups
Traditional pop music singers
Four Star Records artists
Mercury Records artists
Jubilee Records artists
Decca Records artists
American soul musical groups
Musical groups from Philadelphia
Vocal quartets
American vocal groups
1949 establishments in Pennsylvania